The Sitwells (Edith Sitwell, Osbert Sitwell, Sacheverell Sitwell), from Scarborough, North Yorkshire, were three siblings who formed an identifiable literary and artistic clique around themselves in London in the period roughly 1916 to 1930. This was marked by some well-publicised events, notably  Edith's Façade with music by William Walton, with its public debut in 1923. All three Sitwells wrote; for a while their circle was considered by some to rival Bloomsbury, though others dismissed them as attention-seekers rather than serious artists.

Wheels anthologies

The first Sitwell venture was the series of Wheels anthologies produced from 1916. These were seen either as a counterweight to the contemporary Edward Marsh Georgian Poetry anthologies, or as light 'society verse' collections. They did not really match the Imagist anthologies of the same years, or the modernist wing, in terms of finding poets with important careers ahead of them, but included both Nancy Cunard and Aldous Huxley.

Wheels 1916
Nancy Cunard
Arnold James
V. T. Perowne  
Helen Rootham  
Edith Sitwell  
Osbert Sitwell
Sacheverell Sitwell 
Edward Tennant  
Iris Tree

Wheels 1917
Aldous Huxley 
Arnold James
Helen Rootham
Edith Sitwell  
Osbert Sitwell  
Sacheverell Sitwell  
Edward Tennant
Iris Tree
Sherard Vines

Wheels 1918
Álvaro Guevara  
Aldous Huxley  
Arnold James
Edith Sitwell 
Osbert Sitwell  
Sacheverell Sitwell
Iris Tree
Sherard Vines

Wheels 1919
Aldous Huxley  
Arnold James
Wilfred Owen  
Francesco Quevedo  
Edith Sitwell  
Osbert Sitwell  
Sacheverell Sitwell  
Iris Tree
Sherard Vines 

Wheels 1920
John J. Adams  
Leah McTavish Cohen  
Geoffrey Cookson  
Aldous Huxley 
Alan Porter
William Kean Seymour  
Edith Sitwell  
Osbert Sitwell  
Sacheverell Sitwell  
Sherard Vines

Wheels 1921
H. R. Barber  
Aldous Huxley  
Charles Orange  
Alan Porter
Augustine Rivers  
Paul Selver  
Edith Sitwell  
Osbert Sitwell  
Sacheverell Sitwell  
Sherard Vines

Coat of arms
Barry of eight or and vert, charged with three lions rampant sable.  The motto is Ne cede malis (Latin: Yield not to misfortune).

Legacy
Wood End, the former family home of the Sitwells in Scarborough has been redeveloped into a "creative industries centre" providing artists' workspace as well as administrative and learning spaces. Weston Hall in Northamptonshire, owned by the Sitwell family, was sold in 2021.

A large collection of the Sitwells' papers reside at the Harry Ransom Humanities Research Center at The University of Texas, Austin.

A poem by Ogden Nash contains a reference to the family:  "How many miles to Babylon? / Love-in-a-mist and Bovril. / Are there more Sitwells than one? / Oh yes, there are Sacheverell."

There is a coffee shop in Cincinnati, Ohio, named Sitwell's Coffee House in honour of Edith Sitwell.

See also
Edith Sitwell
Osbert Sitwell
Sacheverell Sitwell
Sitwell baronets
William Sitwell

References

Further reading
The Sitwells, Sarah Bradford, published in 1996 by the National Portrait Gallery to accompany the exhibition "The Sitwells and the arts of the 1920s and 1930s"; hardback ; paperback 
Renishaw Hall: The Story of the Sitwells, Desmond Seward; hardback published by Elliott & Thompson, 2015
 A Nest of Tigers: The Sitwells in Their Times, John Lehmann (1968)
 Facades: Edith, Osbert, and Sacheverell Sitwell, John Pearson (1978)

External links
Digitised copies of Wheels on the Modernist Journals Project website
 

English literary movements
Literary collaborations
Sibling musical trios
Literary families
Sitwell family